Guest Peninsula is a snow-covered peninsula about  long between the Sulzberger Ice Shelf and Block Bay, on Saunders Coast in the northwest part of Marie Byrd Land, Antarctica. Mitchell Peak, located on the peninsula, was sighted by the first Byrd Antarctic Expedition in 1929. This feature was defined and mapped as "Guest Island" by the United States Antarctic Service Expedition in 1940. It was determined to be a peninsula by U.S. Geological Survey cartographers from air photos taken by the U.S. Navy, 1962–65. It is named for Amy Guest, a contributor to the Second Byrd Antarctic Expedition, 1933–35.

As originally charted, the westernmost portion of what was then thought to be Guest Island was within the Ross Dependency claimed by New Zealand, but none of the peninsula is actually within the claimed sector.

See also 
 Composite Antarctic Gazetteer
 List of Antarctic islands south of 60° S 
 Scientific Committee on Antarctic Research
 Territorial claims in Antarctica

References

Peninsulas of Marie Byrd Land